Vouvray is a commune in the Indre-et-Loire department in central France. It is around 9 km east of the centre of Tours.

It is best known for its production of white wine, rated among the best in France.

Population

Education
Schools include a public preschool; a public elementary school, Ecole élémentaire publique de Vouvray; a public junior high school, Collège public Gaston Huet; and a private elementary and junior high school, Ecole et Collège Sainte Thérèse à Vouvray.

See also
Communes of the Indre-et-Loire department

References

Communes of Indre-et-Loire